Conspiracies is the third volume in a series of Repairman Jack books written by American author F. Paul Wilson. The book was first published in March 1999 by Gauntlet Press as a signed, limited edition. A trade hardcover edition by Forge followed in February 2000.

Reception
F&SF reviewer Charles de Lint praised the novel as "an entertaining read, with engaging characters and a plot that twists and turns."

References

1999 American novels
Repairman Jack (series)